Corn-Cob was an informal term, promoted by the editors of NZ Railfan magazine, describing a New Zealand railway locomotive livery (resulting from the combination of green and yellow in the colour scheme) found in common usage amongst the railfan community. The livery was introduced on 5 May 2004 when Toll Rail took over the rail system from Tranz Rail and replaced the Bumble-Bee livery. The livery was replaced by the KiwiRail Phase One livery in July 2008. DX 5379 was the first locomotive to wear the livery. The livery represents the colours of Toll Rail and the colours of Australia. When KiwiRail took over the rail system from Toll, the Toll logos on the locomotives were covered or "patched" with the KiwiRail logo.

Variations
Since the introduction of the livery in May 2004, there has only been one variation:

DXB 5143 received the livery in June 2008, had been repainted with a deeper yellow on the front of the cab, running boards and at each end of the loco, however the cab-sides were repainted in lighter shade of yellow. It also lacked the green stripes and Toll Rail insignia on the nose. This was only short-lived and the loco never operated in the livery.
Although not an official variation, DBR 1295 wore the livery without the Toll Rail branding on the short-hood.

Lists of locomotives that wore/wear the Corn-Cob livery

DAR class:
517 - now scrapped

DBR class:
1295 - now preserved by the Glenbrook Vintage Railway

DC class:
4093 - repainted in the MAXX blue livery and now scrapped
4605 - now in the KiwiRail Bold livery
4801 - now in the KiwiRail Bold livery
4818 - repainted in the KiwiRail Bold livery and now preserved by the Glenbrook Vintage Railway
4830 - now scrapped

DFB class:
7023 - now in the KiwiRail Bold livery
7186 - now in the KiwiRail Bold livery
7307 - now in the KiwiRail Bold livery
7348 - now in the KiwiRail Bold livery

DH class:
2839
2851 - now in the KiwiRail Bold livery

DQ class:
6324 - shipped overseas
6347 - shipped overseas

DSC class:
2216 - now scrapped
2379 - now in the KiwiRail livery
2462
2720

DSG class:
3046 - now in the KiwiRail livery

DSJ class:
4004 - now in the KiwiRail livery
4032
4060

DX class:
5074 - now in the KiwiRail Bold livery
5114 - now in the KiwiRail Bold livery
5143 - now in the KiwiFruit livery
5172 - now in the KiwiRail Bold livery
5206 - now in the KiwiRail Bold livery
5212 - repainted in the KiwiRail Bold livery and is now under overhaul at Hutt Workshops
5241 - now in the KiwiRail Bold livery
5258 - now in the KiwiRail Bold livery
5264 - now in the KiwiRail Bold livery
5270 - now in the KiwiRail Bold livery
5287 - now in the KiwiRail Bold livery
5356 - now in the KiwiRail Bold livery
5379 - now in the KiwiRail Bold livery
5385 - now in the KiwiRail Bold livery
5402 - now in the KiwiRail Bold livery
5425 - now in the KiwiRail Bold livery
5431 - now in the KiwiRail Bold livery
5477 - now in the KiwiRail Bold livery
5500 - repainted in the KiwiRail Bold livery and is now stored as a chassis
8007 - now in the KiwiRail Bold livery
8022 - now in the KiwiRail Bold livery

TR class:
845
897 - now in the KiwiRail livery
914 - now in the KiwiRail livery

Gallery

References 

Rail liveries of New Zealand